Bjørn Hougen (15 September 1898 – 1 March 1976) was a Norwegian archaeologist. He was born in Sandefjord and resided in Bærum. He was appointed professor at the University of Oslo in 1952. Among his works are his thesis Snartemofunnet from 1935, and Fra seter til gård from 1947. He was decorated Knight, First Class of the Order of St. Olav in 1967, Commander of the Order of the Dannebrog, Order of Vasa and of the Order of the Lion of Finland.

References

1898 births
1976 deaths
People from Sandefjord
Archaeologists from Oslo
Academic staff of the University of Oslo
Members of the Norwegian Academy of Science and Letters
Commanders of the Order of the Dannebrog
Commanders of the Order of Vasa
Commanders of the Order of the Lion of Finland
20th-century archaeologists